Pieter van Ede (born 30 November 1965) is a Dutch former field hockey player. He competed in the men's tournament at the 1992 Summer Olympics.

References

External links
 

1965 births
Living people
Dutch male field hockey players
Olympic field hockey players of the Netherlands
Field hockey players at the 1992 Summer Olympics
People from Huizen
Sportspeople from North Holland
20th-century Dutch people